Digoin is a commune in the Saône-et-Loire department in the region of Bourgogne-Franche-Comté in eastern France.

The junction of the Canal du Centre and the Canal latéral à la Loire is near Digoin.

Geography
The river Bourbince flows into the Arroux in Digoin, while the Arroux flows into the Loire near Digoin.

Population

Sights

Personalities
Adolphe Piot ( – ), French painter
Alain Robert (born 1962), French rock climber and urban climber
Étienne Maynaud de Bizefranc de Laveaux (1751–1828), French general and Governor of Saint-Domingue

See also
Communes of the Saône-et-Loire department

References

External links
 Town administration of Digoin

Communes of Saône-et-Loire
Burgundy